The Bin el Ouidane Dam is an arch dam located  south of Beni Mellal on the El-Abid River in Azilal Province, Morocco. Designed by Coyne et Bellier and constructed between 1949 and 1953, the purpose of the dam is hydroelectric power production and irrigation. Its  power station produces an average of  annually and water from the reservoir helps irrigate  in the Beni Moussa and Tadla plains.

See also

 List of power stations in Morocco

References

External links

Dams completed in 1953
Energy infrastructure completed in 1953
Dams in Morocco
Arch dams
Hydroelectric power stations in Morocco
Buildings and structures in Béni Mellal-Khénifra
1953 establishments in Morocco
20th-century architecture in Morocco